Črnec (in older sources also Črnče) is a small settlement west of Sveti Gregor in the Municipality of Ribnica in southern Slovenia. The area is part of the traditional region of Lower Carniola and is now included in the Southeast Slovenia Statistical Region.

References

External links

Črnec on Geopedia

Populated places in the Municipality of Ribnica